Parliamentary elections were held in Mongolia on 24 June 2020. The result was a victory for the ruling Mongolian People's Party, which won 62 of the 76 seats, a slight decrease from the 65 won in the 2016 elections.

Electoral system
The 76 members of the State Great Khural will be elected by plurality-at-large voting in multi-member constituencies. The electoral system was not decided until a new electoral law was passed on 22 December 2019. The changes were expected to marginalise smaller parties, and also effectively removed the right of 150,000 Mongolian expatriates to vote, as they could not be registered in a specific constituency. The new electoral law also barred people found guilty of "corrupt practices" from standing in elections. 

Women's right activists called for raising gender quota for nominations from 20% to 30% but they failed. Currently, female legislators make up 17% (13 seats) in the parliament, the highest number since the first democratic elections in 1990.

Parties and coalitions 

606 candidates are officially registered by the General Election Committee of Mongolia running for the election, of whom 121 are independents and 485 candidates from following 13 political parties and 4 coalitions: 
 Mongolian People's Party
 Democratic Party
 Mongolian Green Party
 Our Coalition (Mongolian People's Revolutionary Party, Civil Will–Green Party, Mongolian Traditional United Party)
 New Coalition (Citizen’s Coalition for Justice Party, Mongolian Republican Party, Truth and Right Party, Mongolian National Democratic Party)
 Right Person Electorate Coalition (National Labour Party, Mongolian Social Democratic Party, Justice Party)
 People's Party
 Freedom for People Party
 Development Program Party
 United Patriots Party
 Keep Order! Constitution 19 Coalition (Mongol Conservative Party, For the Mongolian People Party)
 Love the People Party
 World Mongols Party
 Demos Party
 People's Majority Governance Party
 Great Harmony Party
 Ger Area Development Party

Multiple candidates were arrested during the election campaign. Among them, two were running from the governing MPP, three were candidates of the opposition DP and one was a candidate of the Keep Order! Constitution 19 Coalition.

Opinion polls

Results
The Mongolian People's Party won with a supermajority of 62 seats, a slight drop from the 65 won in the prior elections. The centre-right Democratic Party won 11 seats. The candidate of Our Coalition, former State Great Khural member and vice chairperson of the Mongolian People's Revolutionary Party Sainkhüügiin Ganbaatar, won a seat, as did candidate of the Right Person Electorate Coalition and Chairperson of the National Labour Party Togmidyn Dorjkhand. Former Prime Minister of Mongolia Norovyn Altankhuyag won one seat as an Independent candidate.

References

Mongolia
Legislative election
Elections in Mongolia
Mongolia
Election and referendum articles with incomplete results